Live!! is a live album by guitarist Yngwie Malmsteen, released in 1998 through Dreamcatcher Records; it was reissued in 2000 as Double Live in the United States through Spitfire Records. The album was recorded live in Brazil on 5–6 May 1998 at the Olympia in São Paulo, and on 7 May 1998 at the Metropolitan in Rio de Janeiro. According to singer Mats Leven, most of the recordings originate from the second night in São Paulo.

Critical reception

Track listing

Disc one

Disc two

Personnel
Yngwie J. Malmsteen - Guitars, Vocals on "Red House"
Mats Levén - Vocals
Mats Olausson - Keyboards
Barry Dunaway - Bass
Jonas Ostman - Drums
Rich DiSilvio - Cover art & package design

Originally Cozy Powell would be the drummer for this tour, however due to his death on 5 April 1998, Jonas Ostman was hired to replace him.

Japanese Version 

In Japan the album was released with an EP with 3 songs live of the Brazilian hard rock band Dr. Sin. This EP was called 'Live in Brazil'.

References 

1998 live albums
Yngwie Malmsteen live albums